Khorshed Ara Haque was Bangladesh Jatiya Party politician and Member of the Parliament. She was elected from reserved seats for women.

Biography
Haque was nominated to the Parliament of Bangladesh as part of the 50 reserved seats for women, as a candidate from Bangladesh Jatiya Party. Her nomination and that of fellow nominee, Sabiha Nahar Begum of Bangladesh Awami League, were cancelled by Bangladesh Election Commission for unpaid telephone bills. She had 223,488 taka unpaid bills to the state owned Bangladesh Telecommunications Company Limited. She paid her dues to the telecom company and appealed the decision of Bangladesh Election Commission. The Election Commission rejected her appeal on the grounds that the bills were not paid 12 days before her nomination was filled with the commission.

Haque was elected unopposed and declared winner on 10 April 2014 by Bangladesh Election Commission. She is a notable women's right activist in Bangladesh. She was the chief guest at the round table conference titled Planet 50:50 by 2030: Step it up for Gender Equality and against Gender Based Violence in Cox's Bazar on 25 March 2016. The conference was organized by The Daily Star and the United Nations Population Fund. In the conference she said she will discuss laws related to gender based violence in the parliament and that Bangladesh cannot become a developed country with equal rights for women. In Parliament on 9 June 2017, she criticized finance minister Abul Maal Abdul Muhith for his plan to add a 15 percent VAT on all credit and debit accounts in Bangladesh. She was part of a government delegation that distributed relief materials to Rohingya Refugees In Cox's Bazar on 5 October 2017.

References

20th-century births
2022 deaths
Women members of the Jatiya Sangsad
10th Jatiya Sangsad members
21st-century Bangladeshi women politicians
Jatiya Party politicians